New Goshen is a census-designated place (CDP) in Fayette Township, Vigo County, in the U.S. state of Indiana. It is part of the Terre Haute Metropolitan Statistical Area.

History
New Goshen was platted and laid out May 17, 1853, by Hamilton Smith, William Ferguson, George Smith and John Hay. As of 1890 the population was approximately 180.
Future U.S. Senator Birch Bayh was a resident and graduated from New Goshen High; New Goshen High closed in 1959 and was consolidated into today's West Vigo High School.

The post office at New Goshen has been in operation since 1851.

Geography

It is bisected by U.S. Route 150, which connects it to Paris, Illinois to the northwest and West Terre Haute, Indiana to the southwest.

Demographics

References

Census-designated places in Indiana
Census-designated places in Vigo County, Indiana
Terre Haute metropolitan area